In music, Op. 168 stands for Opus number 168. Compositions that are assigned this number include:

 Saint-Saëns – Bassoon Sonata